Evros Football Clubs Association or EPS Evros (Greek: Ένωση Ποδοσφαιρικών Σωματείων Έβρου, ΕΠΣ Έβρου) is a union representing the football teams from the Greek regional unit of Evros. Its headquarters are in Alexandroupoli.

Association football governing bodies in Greece
Evros (regional unit)
1980 establishments in Greece